The red-shouldered cuckooshrike (Campephaga phoenicea) is a species of bird in the family Campephagidae.

It is found in Benin, Burkina Faso, Cameroon, Central African Republic, Chad, Republic of the Congo, Democratic Republic of the Congo, Ivory Coast, Eritrea, Ethiopia, Gambia, Ghana, Guinea, Guinea-Bissau, Kenya, Liberia, Mali, Mauritania, Niger, Nigeria, Senegal, Sierra Leone, Sudan, Togo, and Uganda.

Its natural habitats are subtropical or tropical moist lowland forest and dry savanna.

References

External links
Image at ADW

red-shouldered cuckooshrike
Birds of Sub-Saharan Africa
red-shouldered cuckooshrike
Taxonomy articles created by Polbot